Theistic evolution (also known as theistic evolutionism or God-guided evolution) is a view that  God acts and creates through laws of nature. It posits that the concept of God is compatible with the findings of modern science, including evolution. Theistic evolution is not in itself a scientific theory, but includes a range of views about how science relates to religious beliefs and the extent to which God intervenes. It rejects the strict creationist doctrines of special creation, but can include beliefs such as creation of the human soul. Modern theistic evolution accepts the general scientific consensus on the age of the Earth, the age of the universe, the Big Bang, the origin of the Solar System, the origin of life, and evolution.

Supporters of theistic evolution generally attempt to harmonize evolutionary thought with belief in God and reject the conflict between religion and science; they hold that religious beliefs and scientific theories do not need to contradict each other.

Definition

Francis Collins describes theistic evolution as the position that "evolution is real, but that it was set in motion by God", and characterizes it as accepting "that evolution occurred as biologists describe it, but under the direction of God". He lists six general premises on which different versions of theistic evolution typically rest. They include: 
 The prevailing cosmological model, with the universe coming into being about 13.8 billion years ago;
 The fine-tuned universe;
 Evolution and natural selection;
 No special supernatural intervention is involved once evolution got under way;
 Humans are a result of these evolutionary processes; and
 Despite all these, humans are unique. The concern for the Moral Law (the knowledge of right and wrong) and the continuous search for God among all human cultures defy evolutionary explanations and point to our spiritual nature.

The executive director of the National Center for Science Education in the United States of America, Eugenie Scott, has used the term to refer to the part of the overall spectrum of beliefs about creation and evolution holding the theological view that God creates through evolution. It covers a wide range of beliefs about the extent of any intervention by God, with some approaching deism in rejecting the concepts of continued intervention or special creation, while others believe that God has directly intervened at crucial points such as the origin of humans. In the Catholic version of theistic evolution, human evolution may have occurred, but God must create the human soul, and the creation story in the book of Genesis should be read metaphorically.

When evolutionary science developed, so did different types of theistic evolution. Creationists Henry M. Morris and John D. Morris have listed different terms which were used to describe different positions from the 1890s to the 1920s: "Orthogenesis" (goal-directed evolution), "nomogenesis" (evolution according to fixed law), "emergent evolution", "creative evolution", and others.

Others see "evolutionary creation" (EC, also referred to by some observers as "evolutionary creationism") as the belief that God, as Creator, uses evolution to bring about his plan. The Jesuit paleontologist Pierre Teilhard de Chardin (1881–1955) was an influential proponent of God-directed evolution or "orthogenesis", in which man will eventually evolve to the "omega point" of union with the Creator. Eugenie Scott states in Evolution Vs. Creationism that it is a type of evolution rather than creationism, despite its name. "From a scientific point of view , evolutionary creationism is hardly distinguishable from Theistic Evolution ... [the differences] lie not in science but in theology. According to evolutionary creationist Denis Lamoureux, although referring to the same view, the word arrangement in the term "theistic evolution" places "the process of evolution as the primary term, and makes the Creator secondary as merely a qualifying adjective." Divine intervention is seen at critical intervals in history in a way consistent with scientific explanations of speciation, with similarities to the ideas of progressive creationism that God created "kinds" of animals sequentially.

Regarding the embracing of Darwinian evolution, historian Ronald Numbers describes the position of the late 19th-century geologist George Frederick Wright as "Christian Darwinism".

Historical development

Historians of science (and authors of pre-evolutionary ideas) have pointed out that scientists had considered the concept of biological change well before Darwin.

In the 17th century, the English Nonconformist/Anglican priest and botanist John Ray, in his book The Wisdom of God Manifested in the Works of Creation (1692), had wondered "why such different species should not only mingle together, but also generate an animal, and yet that that hybridous production should not again generate, and so a new race be carried on".

18th-century scientist Carl Linnaeus (1707–1778) published Systema Naturae (1735), a book in which he considered that new varieties of plants could arise through hybridization, but only under certain limits fixed by God. Linnaeus had initially embraced the Aristotelian idea of immutability of species (the idea that species never change), but later in his life he started to challenge it. Yet, as a Christian, he still defended "special creation", the belief that God created "every living creature" at the beginning, as read in Genesis, with the peculiarity a set of original species of which all the present species have descended.

Linnaeus wrote:

Linnaeus attributed the active process of biological change to God himself, as he stated:

Jens Christian Clausen (1967), refers to Linnaeus' theory as a "forgotten evolutionary theory [that] antedates Darwin's by nearly 100 years", and reports that he was a pioneer in doing experiments about hybridization.

Later observations by Protestant botanists Carl Friedrich von Gärtner (1772–1850) and Joseph Gottlieb Kölreuter (1733–1806) denied the immutability of species, which the Bible never teaches. Kölreuter used the term "transmutation of species" to refer to species which have experienced biological changes through hybridization, although they both were inclined to believe that hybrids would revert to the parental forms by a general law of reversion, and therefore, would not be responsible for the introduction of new species. Later, in a number of experiments carried out between 1856 and 1863, the Augustinian friar Gregor Mendel (1822–1884), aligning himself with the "new doctrine of special creation" proposed by Linnaeus, concluded that new species of plants could indeed arise, although limitedly and retaining their own stability.

Georges Cuvier's analysis of fossils and discovery of extinction disrupted static views of nature in the early 19th century, confirming geology as showing a historical sequence of life. British natural theology, which sought examples of adaptation to show design by a benevolent Creator, adopted catastrophism to show earlier organisms being replaced in a series of creations by new organisms better adapted to a changed environment. Charles Lyell (1797–1875) also saw adaptation to changing environments as a sign of a benevolent Creator, but his uniformitarianism envisaged continuing extinctions, leaving unanswered the problem of providing replacements. As seen in correspondence between Lyell and John Herschel, scientists were looking for creation by laws rather than by miraculous interventions. In continental Europe, the idealism of philosophers including Lorenz Oken (1779–1851) developed a Naturphilosophie in which patterns of development from archetypes were a purposeful divine plan aimed at forming humanity. These scientists rejected transmutation of species as materialist. radicalism threatening the established hierarchies of society. The idealist Louis Agassiz (1807–1873), a persistent opponent of transmutation, saw mankind as the goal of a sequence of creations, but his concepts were the first to be adapted into a scheme of theistic evolutionism, when in Vestiges of the Natural History of Creation published in 1844, its anonymous author (Robert Chambers) set out goal-centred progressive development as the Creator's divine plan, programmed to unfold without direct intervention or miracles. The book became a best-seller and popularised the idea of transmutation in a designed "law of progression". The scientific establishment strongly attacked Vestiges  at the time, but later more sophisticated theistic evolutionists followed the same approach of looking for patterns of development as evidence of design.

The comparative anatomist Richard Owen (1804–1892), a prominent figure in the Victorian era scientific establishment, opposed transmutation throughout his life. When formulating homology he adapted idealist philosophy to reconcile natural theology with development, unifying nature as divergence from an underlying form in a process demonstrating design. His conclusion to his On the Nature of Limbs of 1849 suggested that divine laws could have controlled the development of life, but he did not expand this idea after objections from his conservative patrons. Others supported the idea of development by law, including the botanist Hewett Watson (1804–1881) and the Reverend Baden Powell (1796–1860), who wrote in 1855 that such laws better illustrated the powers of the Creator. In 1858 Owen in his speech as President of the British Association said that in "continuous operation of Creative power" through geological time, new species of animals appeared in a "successive and continuous fashion" through birth from their antecedents by a Creative law rather than through slow transmutation.

On the Origin of Species

When Charles Darwin published On the Origin of Species in 1859, many liberal Christians accepted evolution provided they could reconcile it with divine design. The clergymen Charles Kingsley (1819–1875) and Frederick Temple (1821–1902), both conservative Christians in the Church of England, promoted a theology of creation as an indirect process controlled by divine laws. Some strict Calvinists welcomed the idea of natural selection, as it did not entail inevitable progress and humanity could be seen as a fallen race requiring salvation. The Anglo-Catholic Aubrey Moore (1848–1890) also accepted the theory of natural selection, incorporating it into his Christian beliefs as merely the way God worked. Darwin's friend Asa Gray (1810–1888) defended natural selection as compatible with design.

Darwin himself, in his second edition of the Origin (January 1860), had written in the conclusion:

Within a decade most scientists had started espousing evolution, but from the outset some expressed opposition to the concept of natural selection and searched for a more purposeful mechanism. In 1860 Richard Owen attacked Darwin's Origin of Species in an anonymous review while praising "Professor Owen" for "the establishment of the axiom of the continuous operation of the ordained becoming of living things". In December 1859 Darwin had been disappointed to hear that Sir John Herschel apparently dismissed the book as "the law of higgledy-pigglety", and in 1861 Herschel wrote of evolution that "[a]n intelligence, guided by a purpose, must be continually in action to bias the direction of the steps of change–to regulate their amount–to limit their divergence–and to continue them in a definite course". He added "On the other hand, we do not mean to deny that such intelligence may act according to law (that is to say, on a preconceived and definite plan)". The scientist Sir David Brewster (1781–1868), a member of the Free Church of Scotland, wrote an article called "The Facts and Fancies of Mr. Darwin" (1862) in which he rejected many Darwinian ideas, such as those concerning vestigial organs or questioning God's perfection in his work. Brewster concluded that Darwin's book contained both "much valuable knowledge and much wild speculation", although accepting that "every part of the human frame had been fashioned by the Divine hand and exhibited the most marvellous and beneficent adaptions for the use of men".

In the 1860s theistic evolutionism became a popular compromise in science and gained widespread support from the general public. Between 1866 and 1868 Owen published a theory of derivation, proposing that species had an innate tendency to change in ways that resulted in variety and beauty showing creative purpose. Both Owen and Mivart (1827–1900) insisted that natural selection could not explain patterns and variation, which they saw as resulting from divine purpose. In 1867 the Duke of Argyll published The Reign of Law, which explained beauty in plumage without any adaptive benefit as design generated by the Creator's laws of nature for the delight of humans. Argyll attempted to reconcile evolution with design by suggesting that the laws of variation prepared  rudimentary organs for a future need.

Cardinal John Henry Newman wrote in 1868: "Mr Darwin's theory need not then to be atheistical, be it true or not; it may simply be suggesting a larger idea of Divine Prescience and Skill ... and I do not [see] that 'the accidental evolution of organic beings' is inconsistent with divine design — It is accidental to us, not to God."

In 1871 Darwin published his own research on human ancestry in The Descent of Man, concluding that humans "descended from a hairy quadruped, furnished with a tail and pointed ears", which would be classified amongst the Quadrumana along with monkeys, and in turn descended "through a long line of diversified forms" going back to something like the larvae of sea squirts. Critics promptly complained that this "degrading" image "tears the crown from our heads", but there is little evidence that it led to loss of faith. Among the few who did record the impact of Darwin's writings, the naturalist Joseph LeConte struggled with "distress and doubt" following the death of his daughter in 1861, before enthusiastically saying in the late 1870s there was "not a single philosophical question connected with our highest and dearest religious and spiritual interests that is fundamentally affected, or even put in any new light, by the theory of evolution", and in the late 1880s embracing the view that "evolution is entirely consistent with a rational theism". Similarly, George Frederick Wright (1838–1921) responded to Darwin's Origin of Species and Charles Lyell's 1863 Geological Evidences of the Antiquity of Man by turning to Asa Gray's belief that God had set the rules at the start and only intervened on rare occasions, as a way to harmonise evolution with theology. The idea of evolution did not seriously shake Wright's faith, but he later suffered a crisis when confronted with historical criticism of the Bible.

Acceptance

According to Eugenie Scott: "In one form or another, Theistic Evolutionism is the view of creation taught at the majority of mainline Protestant seminaries, and despite the Catholic Church having no official position, it does support belief in it. Studies show that acceptance of evolution is lower in the United States than in Europe or Japan; among 34 countries sampled, only Turkey had a lower rate of acceptance than the United States.

Theistic evolutionism has been described as arguing for compatibility between science and religion, and as such it is viewed with disdain both by some atheists and many young Earth creationists.

Hominization
Hominization, in both science and religion, involves the process or the purpose of becoming human. The process and means by which hominization occurs is a key problem in theistic evolutionary thought, at least for the Abrahamic religions, which hold as a core belief that animals do not have immortal souls but that humans do. Many versions of theistic evolution insist on a special creation consisting of at least the addition of a soul just for the human species.

Scientific accounts of the origin of the universe, the origin of life, and subsequent evolution of pre-human life forms may not cause any difficulty but the need to reconcile religious and scientific views of hominization and to account for the addition of a soul to humans remains a problem. Theistic evolution typically postulates a point at which a population of hominids who had (or may have) evolved by a process of natural evolution acquired souls and thus (with their descendants) became fully human in theological terms. This group might be restricted to Adam and Eve, or indeed to Mitochondrial Eve, although versions of the theory allow for larger populations. The point at which such an event occurred should essentially be the same as in paleoanthropology and archeology, but theological discussion of the matter tends to concentrate on the theoretical. The term "special transformism" is sometimes used to refer to theories that there was a divine intervention of some sort, achieving hominization.

Several 19th-century theologians and evolutionists attempted specific solutions, including the Catholics John Augustine Zahm and St. George Jackson Mivart, but tended to come under attack from both the theological and biological camps. and 20th-century thinking tended to avoid proposing precise mechanisms.

Relationship to other positions

19th-century 'theistic evolution'

The American botanist Asa Gray used the name "theistic evolution" in a now-obsolete sense for his point of view, presented in his 1876 book Essays and Reviews Pertaining to Darwinism. He argued that the deity supplies beneficial mutations to guide evolution. St George Jackson Mivart argued instead in his 1871 On the Genesis of Species that the deity, equipped with foreknowledge, sets the direction of evolution (orthogenesis) by specifying the laws that govern it, and leaves species to evolve according to the conditions they experience as time goes by. The Duke of Argyll set out similar views in his 1867 book The Reign of Law. The historian Edward J. Larson stated that the theory failed as an explanation in the minds of biologists from the late 19th century onwards as it broke the rules of methodological naturalism which they had grown to expect.

Non-theistic evolution
The major criticism of theistic evolution by non-theistic evolutionists focuses on its essential belief in a supernatural creator. Physicist Lawrence Krauss considers that, by the application of Occam's razor, sufficient explanation of the phenomena of evolution is provided by natural processes (in particular, natural selection), and the intervention or direction of a supernatural entity is not required. Evolutionary biologist Richard Dawkins considers theistic evolution a "superfluous attempt" to "smuggle God in by the back door.".

Intelligent design

A number of notable proponents of theistic evolution, including Kenneth R. Miller, John Haught, George Coyne, Simon Conway Morris, Denis Alexander, Ard Louis, Darrel Falk, Alister McGrath, Francisco J. Ayala, and Francis Collins are critics of intelligent design.

Young Earth creationism
Young Earth creationists including Ken Ham prefer to criticize theistic evolution on theological grounds rather than on any scientific data, finding it hard to reconcile the nature of a loving God with the process of evolution, in particular, the existence of death and suffering before the Fall of Man. They consider that it undermines central biblical teachings by regarding the creation account as a myth, a parable, or an allegory, instead of treating it as an accurate record of historical events. They also fear that a capitulation to what they call "atheistic" naturalism will confine God to the gaps in scientific explanations, undermining biblical doctrines, such as God's incarnation through Christ.

See also

American Scientific Affiliation
The BioLogos Foundation
Day-age creationism
Deistic evolution
"Epic of evolution"
Evolutionary creation
Natural theology
Orthogenesis
Old Earth creationism
Religious naturalism
Teleology in biology

Notes

References

Sources
 Artigas, Mariano; Glick, Thomas F., Martínez, Rafael A.; Negotiating Darwin: the Vatican confronts evolution, 1877–1902, JHU Press, 2006, 9780801883897, Google books
 
 
 Brundell, Barry, "Catholic Church Politics and Evolution Theory, 1894-1902", The British Journal for the History of Science, Vol. 34, No. 1 (Mar., 2001), pp. 81–95, Cambridge University Press on behalf of The British Society for the History of Science, JSTOR
 
 Kung, Hans, beginning of all things: science and religion, trans. John Bowden, Wm. B. Eerdmans Publishing, 2007, . ]

Further reading

Contemporary approaches
Collins, Francis; (2006) The Language of God: A Scientist Presents Evidence for Belief 
Michael Dowd (2009) Thank God for Evolution: How the Marriage of Science and Religion Will Transform Your Life and Our World 
Falk, Darrel; (2004) Coming to Peace with Science: Bridging the Worlds Between Faith and Biology 
Miller, Kenneth R.; (1999) Finding Darwin's God: A Scientist's Search for Common Ground Between God and Evolution 
Miller, Keith B.; (2003) Perspectives on an Evolving Creation 
Corrado Ghinamo; (2013) The Beautiful Scientist: a Spiritual Approach to Science ;

Accounts of the history
Appleby, R. Scott. Between Americanism and Modernism; John Zahm and Theistic Evolution, in Critical Issues in American Religious History: A Reader, Ed. by Robert R. Mathisen, 2nd revised edn., Baylor University Press, 2006, . Google books
Harrison, Brian W., Early Vatican Responses to Evolutionist Theology, Living Tradition, Organ of the Roman Theological Forum, May 2001.
Morrison, John L., "William Seton: A Catholic Darwinist", The Review of Politics, Vol. 21, No. 3 (Jul., 1959), pp. 566–584, Cambridge University Press for the University of Notre Dame du lac, JSTOR
O'Leary, John. Roman Catholicism and modern science: a history, Continuum International Publishing Group, 2006,  Google books

External links

 Evolutionary Creation: A Christian Approach to Evolution by Denis Lamoureux (St. Joseph's College, Edmonton)
 About: Agnosticism/Atheism on 'Theistic Evolution & Evolutionary Creationism' by Austin Cline; overview of various viewpoints
 Creationism: What's a Catholic to Do? by Michael D. Guinan, O.F.M.; critical assessment of creationism and intelligent design from a Roman Catholic perspective.
 What is Creationism? by Mark Isaak, presents various forms of creationism
 What is Evolution? by Laurence Moran, presents a standard definition for evolution
 Old Earth Ministries Old Earth Creationism, with section on theistic evolution
 Evolution & Creation: A Theosophic Synthesis Surveys critical problems in Darwinist explanations and common theistic views; explores ancient and modern "excluded middle" alternatives
 The Vatican's View of Evolution: The Story of Two Popes by Doug Linder (2004)
 Nobel Prize winner Charles Townes on evolution and "intelligent design"
 Spectrum of Creation Beliefs From Flat Earthism to Atheistic Evolutionism, including Theistic Evolution
 Human Timeline (Interactive) – Smithsonian, National Museum of Natural History (August 2016).

Proponents of theistic evolution

Organizations
God and Evolution at the TalkOrigins Archive
BioLogos
Perspectives on Theistic Evolution An examination of both the theological and scientific aspects of theistic evolution.
The "Clergy Letter" Project signed by thousands of clergy supporting evolution and faith

Religious belief and doctrine
Evolution and religion

Catholic theology and doctrine